Rescue Squad is a 1935 American crime film directed by Spencer Gordon Bennet and starring Ralph Forbes, Verna Hillie and Leon Ames.

Cast
 Ralph Forbes DeWitt Porter  
 Verna Hillie as Norma Britt  
 Leon Ames as Lester Vaughn 
 Kate Pentzer as Mollie Borden  
 Sheila Terry as Rose  
 Beth Bartman as Daisy Dane  
 Frank Leigh as Azoor  
 Catherine Cotter as Jennie, Aoor's Daughter 
 Jimmy Aubrey as Henry, the Janitor

References

Bibliography
 Pitts, Michael R. Poverty Row Studios, 1929–1940: An Illustrated History of 55 Independent Film Companies, with a Filmography for Each. McFarland & Company, 2005.

External links
 

1935 films
1935 crime films
1930s English-language films
American crime films
Films directed by Spencer Gordon Bennet
American black-and-white films
1930s American films